Ann Matthews Martin (born August 12, 1955) is an American children's fiction writer, known best for The Baby-Sitters Club series.

Early life
Ann Matthews Martin grew up in Princeton, NJ. Her mother, Eden Martin, was a preschool teacher and her father, Henry Martin, was a cartoonist for The New Yorker and other publications. Her mother's ancestry can be traced back to the pilgrims who traveled on the Mayflower in 1620. She has a younger sister, Jane.

Martin developed an interest in writing from an early age. Before she was old enough to write, she would dictate stories to her mother to write down for her. Some of her favorite authors at that time were Lewis Carroll, P. L. Travers, Hugh Lofting, Astrid Lindgren, and Roald Dahl. Martin loved creative writing in elementary school and discovered her passion for writing in second grade. She began writing short stories, and her fourth-grade teacher wrote on her student folder that she would make a wonderful writer because she spent so much of her free time writing in notebooks. Her favorite subjects in middle school and high school were English and French, and her least favorite was math.

As a teen, Martin loved working with children and decided to become a teacher. She wanted to help children with disabilities, so she worked during the summer at the Eden Institute, a school for autistic children in her hometown.

After graduating from Princeton High School in 1973, Martin attended Smith College from 1973 to 1977. She studied early-childhood education and child psychology. Her senior thesis was on the use of children's literature in the classroom. She lived in Gardiner House and wrote for Smith College newspaper, The Sophian. Describing her Smith education, Martin said “it was an environment of strong, independent women, both the students and the professors.” Her time at Smith influenced her identity as a feminist and inspired her to portray female characters who were like the women she knew in her own life.

Career
After graduating from Smith College, Martin taught in a split fourth and fifth-grade classroom at Plumfield School in Noroton, Connecticut. Her students, ages 8–13, struggled with learning disabilities including dyslexia and autism. Martin has said that her work with special needs children influenced her writing.

After teaching for a year, Martin decided to pursue publishing. She worked her way up from an editorial assistant to a senior editor, and she worked for several well-known children's book publishers, including Pocket Books and Scholastic. She is now a full-time writer.

In 1983, Martin published her first book, Bummer Summer, which earned the Children's Choice Award in 1985. She began writing The Baby-Sitters Club series in 1985 while working for Scholastic as a children's book editor. After Martin wrote the first 35 novels in The Baby-Sitters Club series, Scholastic hired ghostwriters to continue the series. She now concentrates on writing single novels, many of which are set in the 1960s. One of those novels, A Corner of the Universe, won a Newbery Honor in 2003. In 2010, Martin published a prequel to The Baby-Sitters Club series titled The Summer Before.

Martin finds the ideas for her books from many different sources; some are based on personal experiences, while others are based on childhood memories and feelings. Many are about contemporary problems and struggles. All of her characters, including the members of The Baby-Sitters Club, are fictional, but many of her characters are based on real people. Sometimes she names her characters after people she knows, and other times she simply chooses names that she likes.

In 1990, Martin and her colleagues founded "The Lisa Libraries" to honor and memorialize their friend Lisa Novak. This non-profit organization distributes new books to children and establishes libraries in under-served areas. In the same year, Martin also founded the Ann M. Martin Foundation, which provides financial support for art, education, and literacy programs in addition to programs for abused and stray animals.

Martin served as a producer for the 2020 Netflix adaptation of The Baby-Sitters Club.

Personal life
Martin currently maintains a fairly quiet public profile. After living in New York City for many years, Martin moved to the Hudson Valley in upstate New York, where she enjoys nature and fostering kittens. Martin posts semi-regular updates and snapshots of her life on her Facebook page. She stays busy with author appearances and adaptations of her works such as the Babysitters' Club graphic novels and network series. Martin was previously in a relationship with Laura Godwin, with whom she wrote the four Doll People books; she disclosed that Godwin was her partner in 2016.

Works
Standalone novels
 Bummer Summer (1983)
 Inside Out (1984)
 Missing Since Monday (1986)
 With and Without You (1986)
 Just a Summer Romance (1987)
 Slam Book (1987)
 Yours Turly, Shirley (1988)
 Ma and Pa Dracula (1989)
 Belle Teal (2001)
 A Corner of the Universe (2002)
 On Christmas Eve (2006)
 Rain Reign (2014)

Novels and sequels
 Stage Fright (1984)
 Me and Katie (The Pest) (1985)
 Ten Kids, No Pets (1988)
 Eleven Kids, One Summer (1991)
 P.S. Longer Letter Later (1998), by Martin and Paula Danziger
 Snail Mail No More (1999), Martin and Danziger
 A Dog's Life: The Autobiography of a Stray (2005)
 Everything for a Dog (2009)
 Ten Rules for Living with My Sister (2011)
 Ten Good and Bad Things About My Life (So Far) (2012)

Picture books
 Rachel Parker, Kindergarten Showoff (1992) with illustrations by Nancy Poydar
 Leo The Magnificat (1996) with illustrations by Emily Arnold McCully

Short stories
 8 x 2 = Sweet Sixteen, a short story featuring Karen Brewer included in the children's anthology It's Great to Be Eight (2000)
 The Lost Art of Letter Writing, a short story included in the young adult anthology What You Wish For (2011)

Other works
 Because of Shoe and Other Dog Stories (edited) (2012)
Series
 The Baby-Sitters Club (1986–1990 and 2010) 35 volumes to 1990, continued by other writers with Martin
The Baby-Sitters Little Sister (1988 to 2000)
The Kids in Ms. Colman's Class (1995 to 1998) 12 volumes
 California Diaries (1997 to 2000) 15 volumes
 Main Street (2007 to 2011)
Welcome to Camden Falls (2007)
Needle and Thread (2007)
'Tis the Season (2007)
Best Friends (2008)
The Secret Book Club (2008)
September Surprises (2008)
Keeping Secrets (2009)
Special Delivery (2009)
Coming Apart (2010)
Staying Together (2011)
The Doll People (2000 to 2008) – by Martin and Laura Godwin, illustrated by Brian Selznick
The Doll People (2000)
The Meanest Doll in the World (2003)
The Runaway Dolls (2008)
The Doll People Set Sail (2014)
Family Tree (2013-2014)
Better to Wish (2013)
The Long Way Home (2013)
Best Kept Secret (2014)
Home Is the Place (2014)
 Missy Piggle-Wiggle (2016 to 2018) – by Martin and Annie Parnell, great-granddaughter of Betty MacDonald, who created Mrs. Piggle-Wiggle in 1947; illustrated by Ben Hatke. 
Missy Piggle-Wiggle and the Whatever Cure (2016)
Missy Piggle-Wiggle and the Won't-Walk-the-Dog Cure (2017)
Missy Piggle-Wiggle and the Sticky-Fingers Cure (2018)

References

External links

 Ann M. Martin at publisher Scholastic
 Ann M. Martin by Margaret Becker, 1993
 
 Ann M. Martin papers at the Mortimer Rare Book Collection, Smith College Special Collections
 Ann M. Martin Foundation
 The Lisa Libraries

1955 births
American children's writers
American writers of young adult literature
The Baby-Sitters Club
Newbery Honor winners
People from Princeton, New Jersey
Princeton High School (New Jersey) alumni
Living people
Smith College alumni
20th-century American novelists
21st-century American novelists
20th-century American women writers
21st-century American women writers
American women children's writers
American women novelists
Novelists from New Jersey
Women writers of young adult literature
American LGBT writers